Fathi Tawfiq Abdulrahim is a Yemeni politician. He quit his position as  head of the Finance Committee of Parliament over the 2011 Yemeni uprising.

References

Yemeni politicians
Living people
Year of birth missing (living people)
Place of birth missing (living people)